BC Pärnu, also known as BC Pärnu Sadam (Port of Pärnu) for sponsorship reasons, is a professional basketball club based in Pärnu, Estonia. The team plays in the Latvian–Estonian Basketball League. Their home arena is the Pärnu Sports Hall.

In 2022, the team won their first Estonian Championship.

History
BC Pärnu was founded in 2000. In 2006, the Pärnu men's team were promoted to the top-tier Korvpalli Meistriliiga (KML). The team finished the 2006–07 season last, winning only two games. Pärnu finished the 2007–08 regular season in seventh place and advanced to the playoffs for the first time where they were defeated in the quarterfinals by Kalev, losing the series 0–2. The team made their debut in the Baltic Basketball League (BBL) in the 2012–13 season, reaching the Top 16 stage. In 2016, Pärnu finished third in the Estonian Cup. Pärnu entered the 2017 KML Playoffs as the fourth seed and defeated TTÜ in the quarterfinals, but were eliminated in the semifinals by Kalev and lost to University of Tartu in the third place games.

On 12 July 2017, Pärnu announced that the men's team will withdraw due to financial difficulties. However, the team would stay in the KML after reaching an agreement with KK Paulus.

On 26 May 2022, Pärnu won its first national championship in club history after defeating Tartu 3–0 in the Finals of the 2022 KML Play-offs.

Sponsorship naming
Pärnu has had several denominations through the years due to its sponsorship:

KK Pärnu/Catwees: 2007–2009
BC Pärnu Sadam (Port of Pärnu): 2015–present

Home arenas
Pärnu High School Gym (2006–2009)
Pärnu Sports Hall (2009–present)

Players

Current roster

Coaches

Indrek Ruut 2006–2009
Rait Käbin 2009–2012
Priit Vene 2012–2013
Darko Ivanović 2013–2014

Mait Käbin 2014–2016
Heiko Rannula 2016–2022
Toomas Annuk 2022
Gert Kullamäe 2022–present

Season by season

European competitions

Trophies and awards

Trophies
Estonian Championship: (1)
2021-2022

Individual awards

KML Finals MVP
Andris Misters – 2022

KML Best Defender
Mihkel Kirves – 2017, 2018, 2019
Märt Rosenthal – 2021

KML Best Young Player
Norman Käbin – 2016
Hugo Toom – 2021

All-KML Team
Demetre Rivers – 2019
Edon Maxhuni – 2021

Notes

References

External links 
 

Basketball teams in Estonia
Basketball teams established in 2000
2000 establishments in Estonia
Sport in Pärnu
Korvpalli Meistriliiga